Noosfera is a polar supply and research ship operated by the National Antarctic Scientific Center of Ukraine. Until 2021, she was operated by the British Antarctic Survey and named RRS James Clark Ross.

History

British Antarctic Survey
RRS James Clark Ross was constructed at Swan Hunter Shipbuilders in Wallsend, UK and was named after the British explorer James Clark Ross. She was launched by Her Majesty Queen Elizabeth II 1st December 1990. 

In March 2018, RRS James Clark Ross was due to sample the marine life around the world's biggest iceberg, A-68, but was unable to reach the site due to sea ice conditions.

After 30 years service, James Clark Ross was sold to the National Antarctic Scientific Center of Ukraine, in August 2021.

Gallery

See also
 Vernadsky Research Base
 , a former British Antarctic Survey Royal Research Ship.
 , a new Royal Research Ship which entered service in 2021.
 James Ross Island

Footnotes

History of Antarctica
Hydrography
Icebreakers of the United Kingdom
Oceanographic instrumentation
Research vessels of the United Kingdom
1990 ships
Ships built by Swan Hunter
Ships built on the River Tyne
British Antarctic Survey
Icebreakers of Ukraine
Research vessels of Ukraine
Ukraine and the Antarctic